Take Your Pick! is a United Kingdom game show originally broadcast by Radio Luxembourg starting in 1952. The show was transferred to television in 1955 with the launch of ITV, where it continued until 1968. It was the first game show broadcast in the UK to offer cash prizes.

The programme was later revived from 24 February 1992 to 23 December 1999. The show featured female assistants to accompany Des O'Connor. They were Jodie Wilson in the first two of the revived series, then Gillian Blakeney and Gayle Blakeney in 1994, followed by Sarah Matravers (1996) and Sasha Lawrence in 1998.

History

The first version of the television show was produced by Associated-Rediffusion (later Rediffusion London), while the revival was made by Thames Television, whose arrival as the new London weekday ITV company had led to the demise of the original show.

During the gameplay, contestants would answer a series of questions without using the words yes or no in what was known as the "Yes-No Interlude". If they failed to answer all the questions, they would subsequently be gonged off the stage. If successful, however, contestants would answer more questions to win modest monetary prizes. At the climax of the show, contestants would be offered the choice of whether to "take the money" (take all money they had earned so far) or "open the box", which could contain good prizes such as a holiday or a washing machine. It could also contain booby prizes such as a mousetrap or a bag of sweets.

The first version was hosted by Michael Miles. After its demise, Miles hosted a similar show for Southern Television called Wheel of Fortune, not to be confused with the later Wheel of Fortune of the same title. Bob Danvers-Walker, who was the voice of Pathé News from 1940 until its demise in 1970, was the show's announcer. Alec Dane was on hand to bang the gong. Harold Smart was at the electronic organ. A similar formula was used for Pot of Gold, another game show hosted by O'Connor.

Singer and TV presenter Des O'Connor became the host for the second version, which aired from 1992 to 1999. His future wife, Australian born Jodie Wilson, was one of the hostesses; she would later be replaced by former Neighbours twins Gayle and Gillian Blakeney, also from Australia.

A one-off revival was broadcast in 2005 as part of Ant & Dec's Gameshow Marathon, a celebrity game show tournament produced as part of commemorations of ITV's 50th anniversary. Another one-off revival was broadcast as part of the similar 2020 ITV series Alan Carr's Epic Gameshow. This version added a bonus round, where one of the contestants selects boxes from rows of a pyramid, and could risk their prizes for a chance at a major prize inside one of two "golden boxes" placed at the top of the pyramid.

Gameplay

Yes-No interlude
In this opening game, the host asked the contestant a series of questions in a 60-second span. The contestant could not say "yes" or "no", nor could they nod or shake their heads. If they did, the co-host would bang the gong and the next contestant would be introduced. Those completing the minute successfully were awarded five shillings. In the 1992–1999 version they were awarded £1 a second.

Box numbers and the prizes
There were 10 boxes numbered from 1 to 10. Three of them would contain booby prizes, one would contain a card awarding a star prize (e.g., a small car or holiday package), and six would contain cards announcing other prizes (e.g., appliances, furniture, or a "treasure chest" of cash (£50 in the Miles series, £500 in the first O'Connor series, £1,000 for the remaining series). No-one, including the host, knew which prize was in each box. However, the audience was given a preview of the actual prizes, shown on screen, and listed by Bob Danvers-Walker, from off-screen. The list always culminated in the announcement of "tonight's star prize".

Contestants would be asked general-knowledge questions. If they answered three out of four questions correctly, they picked a key from a set of ten, corresponding to one of the first ten boxes. The host would then try to buy back the key with increasing amounts of cash, up to about £50 (or, in the revival, a number of hundreds of pounds). One box also included a key to box 13, which would trigger another round of bidding while the contestant had to choose between their first prize, cash, or box 13 which could have an expensive household item or a booby prize.

Cultural references
A sketch in Monty Python's Flying Circus (called "Spot the Brain Cell" in a later audio version) features John Cleese portraying a wildly exaggerated version of Michael Miles. One contestant opts to play for a blow on the head and, after rejecting several offered "prizes" that are actually forms of physical abuse, receives it in the form of being hit over the head with a giant mallet. An early version of this sketch appeared in At Last the 1948 Show. For a time, after Miles' death, the sketch was not shown by the BBC, but it has since been reinstated.

Also, in the Dirty Hungarian Phrasebook sketch in Monty Python's Flying Circus, a prosecutor (played by Eric Idle) plays the game with Alexander Yalt (played by Michael Palin). The prosecutor manages to gong Yalt "out" for answering a question with "yes" (although Yalt was probably unaware of playing the game in the first place).

A sketch in the BBC Radio comedy series The Burkiss Way featured a "Dinosaur-Cheese Interlude", in which contestants were required to answer questions without mentioning any species of dinosaur or any variety of cheese (besides Edam, which was "made" backwards). Naturally, all the contestants did accidentally mention them.

A fifth-season episode of the radio show Hancock's Half Hour (broadcast May 1958) had Tony Hancock appear on the (unnamed) show and win £4,000.

The British progressive rock band Hatfield and the North named one of their songs "The Yes No Interlude". It is included in their second LP, The Rotters' Club. Also the song "Fitter Stoke has a bath" on the same LP, contains the lyrics "Michael Miles, bogey man".

The 1970s radio programme I'm Sorry, I'll Read That Again made frequent references to Take Your Pick! with phrases such as (in this case, apropos of a vampire rabbit and its coffin): "Stake the bunny!" "Hop in the box!"

Transmissions

Associated-Rediffusion

Thames

References

External links

Take Your Pick! (1955–1968) at British Film Institute
Take Your Pick! (1992–1999) at British Film Institute
.

1955 British television series debuts
1999 British television series endings
1950s British game shows
1960s British game shows
1990s British game shows
British television series revived after cancellation
English-language television shows
ITV game shows
Television series by Fremantle (company)
Television shows produced by Associated-Rediffusion
Television shows produced by Thames Television
Television shows shot at Teddington Studios